Neargyrioides is a genus of moths of the family Crambidae. It contains only one species, Neargyrioides aglaopis, which is found in Australia, where it has been recorded from the Northern Territory and Queensland.

References

Natural History Museum Lepidoptera genus database

Crambinae
Monotypic moth genera
Taxa named by Stanisław Błeszyński
Moths of Australia
Crambidae genera